Wajdi (also transliterated as Vecdi (Turkish), or Wagdi (Egyptian Arabic)) is a masculine Arabic name.

People with the given name

Vecdi
 Vecdi Gönül (born 1939), Turkish politician

Wajdi
Wajdi al-Ahdal, Yemeni writer
Wajdi Bouallègue, Tunisian gymnast
Wajdi Jaafar, Film director, 3D artist
Wajdi Bouazzi, Tunisian football player
Wajdi Dawo, Libyan basketball player
Wajdi Essid, Tunisian football manager
Wajdi Mallat, Lebanese jurist, statesman and author
Wajdi Mouawad, Canadian writer, actor and director
Wajdi Al-Hawari, Canadian engineer, Cloud Developer
Wajdi Sinen, Tunisian-born Qatari handball player

People with the middle name
Asyraf Wajdi Dusuki, Malaysian politician

People with the surname

Wajdi
Farid Wajdi, member of the Judicial Commission of Indonesia
Mubarak Wajdi, Saudi football player

Wagdy
Anwar Wagdi, Egyptian actor, writer and director
Wagdy Abd el-Hamied Mohamed Ghoneim, normally shortened to Wagdy Ghoneim (born 1951), Egyptian-Qatari Salafi Muslim preacher and writer
Mahmoud Wagdy (born 1948), Egyptian politician
Sherine Wagdy, Egyptian singer

See also
Wagdi language, one of the Bhil languages of India spoken mainly in Dungarpur and Banswara districts of Southern Rajasthan. Wagdi has been characterized as a dialect of Bhili.

Arabic-language surnames
Arabic masculine given names
Turkish masculine given names